Marumba poliotis is a species of moth of the  family Sphingidae. It is known from India.

It is a small, grey species. There are shades of pale grey and pale brown on the forewing upperside, crossed by crenulated and irregular transverse lines.

References

Marumba
Moths described in 1907